AGB are a Dutch amateur  football (soccer) club from the Amsterdam borough of Amsterdam Nieuw-West, founded on 27 May 1982, the team play their home matches at the Sportpark Ookmeer.

History
AGB stands for Amsterdam Gençler Birliği, which is Turkish for Amsterdam Youth Union an amateur Dutch football club which was founded by Turkish immigrants in the Netherlands. AGB started the 2013-14 season fielding both a Saturday and a Sunday squad, playing in the Derde Klasse and Vierde Klasse of the KNVB district West-I respectively. While the Saturday squad competing in the Derde Klasse withdrew from competition midway through the season.

References

External links 
 AGB Official website

Football clubs in the Netherlands
Football clubs in Amsterdam
Association football clubs established in 1982
1982 establishments in the Netherlands
Turkish association football clubs outside Turkey
Diaspora sports clubs